The AFA catalog  is a specialised Danish postage stamp catalog for the country of Denmark and historically related areas such as the Faroe Islands, Greenland, Iceland and the Danish West Indies. It was first published in 1935 by Harry Poulsen, a stamptrader from the town of Aarhus. For many years the publisher was Lars Boes, until the year 2000 when Erling Daugaard, the owner of the philatelic company Nordfrim, took over the publishing of the catalog.

References

External links 
 

Philately of Greenland
Philately of Denmark
Philately of the Faroe Islands
Stamp catalogs